2Blades is an agricultural phytopathology non-profit which performs research to improve durable genetic resistance in crops, and funds other researchers to do the same. 2Blades was co-founded by Dr. Roger Freedman and Dr. Diana Horvath in 2004.

Funding source
2Blades  is partly funded by the Gatsby Charitable Foundation does its research at The Sainsbury Laboratory, among other locations . One co-founder, Chairman Roger Freedman also works for Gatsby, which was founded by Lord David Sainsbury. Freedman had pitched an idea to Sainsbury's venture capital company to begin investing in plant genetic engineering technologies, and although the board did so, they found someone else to lead it. Freedman had wanted to run it, but was told that was not for him by Sainsbury. Indeed, soon thereafter Sainsbury set up another early investment company specifically for Freedman and a colleague, and a separate non-profit for Freedman to grant money, both for plant science. The non-profit was 2Blades.

Research activities
2Blades routinely works in partnership with other crop disease organizations like CIMMYT and BGRI. The foundation also conducts research in partnerships with the industry, including with Bayer CropScience and Monsanto. The organisation's End the Blight campaign has been joined by CIP (the International Potato Center) and Chairman of Joseph P. Kennedy Enterprises Christopher Kennedy. This campaign is advancing research and delivering cultivars specifically for Phytophthora infestans in Africa. Mr Kennedy is chairman of 2Blades African Potato Initiative which is funding the delivery of a Victoria-based cultivar to East African markets.

Crops and pathogens of research interest to the foundation include P. infestans on potato, rye, Phakopsora pachyrhizi on soybean, Puccinia graminis f. sp. tritici on wheat, and Fusarium oxysporum f.sp. cubense on Musa spp.

References

Bibliography of affiliated personnel
  (ISNI 0000000134837464). BLDSC number: D1141/71. Jisc text ill. BL EThOS ID uk.bl.ethos.455951
 
 
 
 
  PD ORCID 0000-0003-0620-5923 GS N3w9QUUAAAAJ RID D-1181-2009. RF ISNI 0000000134837464.
  PD ORCID 0000-0003-0620-5923 GS N3w9QUUAAAAJ RID D-1181-2009. RF ISNI 0000000134837464.
 Oadi N. Matny, Mehran Patpour, Ming Luo, Liqiong Xie, Soma Chakraborty, Aihua Wang, James A. Kolmer, Terese Richardson, Dhara Bhatt, Mohammad Hoque, Chris Sorenson, Burkhard Steuernagel, Brande B. H. Wulff, Narayana Upadhyaya, Rohit Mago, Sam Periyannan, Evans Lagudah, Roger Freedman (ISNI 0000000134837464), Lynne Reuber, Brian J. Steffenson, and Michael Ayliffe, A Wheat Multi-Transgene Cassette Provides Stem and Leaf Rust Resistance in the Field. In Plant and Animal Genome XXVIII Conference (January 11-15, 2020). PAG.

External links
 Official website: 

Phytopathology
Wheat diseases
Agronomy
Plant breeding
Genetic engineering and agriculture